Deathcheaters is a 1976 Australian action adventure film directed by Brian Trenchard-Smith and starring John Hargreaves and Grant Page.

Plot
Steve and Rodney are two ex-Vietnam commandos who do stunt work for television. They are hired by the government to raid the island stronghold of a Filipino racketeer and secure papers from his safe. The two men make the raid and escape using a hang-glider.

Cast
John Hargreaves as Steve Hall
Grant Page as Rodney Cann
Margaret Trenchard-Smith (as Margaret Gerard) as Julia Hall
Noel Ferrier as Mr Culpepper
Judith Woodroffe as Gloria
Ralph Cotterill as uncivil servant
John Krumme as Anticore director
Drew Forsythe as battle director
Brian Trenchard-Smith as hit and run director
Michael Aitkens as police driver
Roger Ward as police sergeant
Wallas Eaton as police sergeant
Dale Aspin as lady car driver
Peter Collingwood as Mr Langham
Chris Haywood as butcher
Ann Semler as Lina
Max Aspin as bank robber
David Bracks as bank robber
Reg Evans as army sergeant
Vincent Ball as naval intelligence officer

Production
The film was funded by the Australian Film Commission, Channel 9 and D.L. Taffner. It was intended to be a pilot for a TV series that could be shown theatrically in Australia and sold to television outside.

It was shot in 16mm and blown up to 35mm for theatrical release. Trenchard Smith had worked with stuntman Grant Page several times and gave him his first lead role here. He also cast his wife, Margaret Gerard, as the female lead.

Trenchard Smith says the movie went $7,000 over budget.

Release
The film performed disappointingly in Australia theatrically. It had a presale to Channel Nine for $50,000, overseas sales of $40,000 and local rentals of $30,000, so made $120,000. In 1979 Trenchard-Smith was still confident the film would be profitable.

(In 1977 Antony I. Ginnane claimed the film netted $130,000 in overseas sales.)

Reception
On Rotten Tomatoes, Andrew L. Urban of Urban Cinefile positively commented "nobody in their right minds would do it again, not with real actors today not even with stuntmen. Unmissable!"

Accolades
Ron Williams was nominated for Best Editing at the 1977 Australian Film Institute Awards.

References

External links

Deathcheaters at Grindhousemovie Database
Deathcheaters at Oz Movies

1970s action adventure films
Films directed by Brian Trenchard-Smith
1976 films
Films set in the Philippines
Films about stunt performers
Australian action adventure films
Films shot in Sydney
1970s English-language films